Vasilevskis may refer to:

Vadims Vasiļevskis (born 1982), a Latvian javelin thrower
2014 Vasilevskis, a main-belt asteroid discovered on May 2, 1973